Snuffles can refer to:

Science
 A common term for a runny nose; see Rhinitis
 Syphilitic rhinitis, a presentation of congenital syphilis
 A disease of rabbits caused by the bacterium Bordetella bronchiseptica

Other uses
 Gund Snuffles, teddy bear made by GUND
 Snuffles (character), a cartoon character from Quick Draw McGraw
 A character from the animated series Rick & Morty
 A character from the comic strip Pearls Before Swine
Sirius Black, a fictional codename for the character from Harry Potter.